The Grantland Rice Trophy was an annual award presented in the United States from 1954 to 2013 to the college football team recognized by the Football Writers Association of America (FWAA) as the National Champions.

Named for the legendary sportswriter Grantland Rice, the trophy was the first national championship award to be presented after the college football bowl games.  Through 1991 voting was undertaken by the membership of the FWAA, but after 1992 was conducted amongst a panel of four or five selected writers, initially by a positional voting system but after 1994 by a single-team vote.  Beginning in 2002, the FWAA also began issuing a national poll to go along with the Grantland Rice Trophy.  The top team in the final poll was awarded the trophy.  The trophy itself consisted of a bronze football atop a four-sided pedestal.

On August 26, 2010, the FWAA announced that the 2004 award presented to the USC Trojans had been rescinded, the first time in the award's history that a winner has vacated the honor. The FWAA declined to name a replacement for that year's award.

With the advent of the College Football Playoff (CFP) for the 2014 season, the FWAA quietly retired the Grantland Rice Trophy, joining with the National Football Foundation (NFF) to instead publish the FWAA-NFF Grantland Rice Super 16 Poll during the regular season, with the CFP champion automatically receiving the NFF's MacArthur Bowl Trophy.

Winners

By school

See also
AFCA National Championship Trophy
AP National Championship Trophy
MacArthur Bowl
BCS National Championship Game
College Football Playoff National Championship Trophy
NCAA Division I-A national football championship

References

External links
Official site
Voting archive

College football championship trophies